Peerzada Mian Shahzad Maqbool Bhutta (born 10 November 1982, Multan) is a Pakistani politician who was a Member of the Provincial Assembly of the Punjab, from May 2013 to May 2018.

References

Living people
Punjab MPAs 2013–2018
1982 births
Pakistan Muslim League (N) politicians